"El Farsante" is a song recorded by Puerto Rican singer Ozuna. It was released as a single in July 2017 as the third single from his debut album Odisea. A remixed version alongside American bachata singer Romeo Santos was released on January 30, 2018 while its music video premiered the same day.

Production
The song "El Farsante" is a Latin R&B song. It includes a blend of Latin pop, and trap.

Background
In the song, Ozuna speaks of his want to reconcile and save his relationship with an unnamed partner.

Music video
The remixed music video, featuring Romeo Santos, was released on January 30, 2018. The video was shot  in multiple locations of New York City and Caracas .The video has gained over 1.4 billion views as of April 2020.

Charts

Weekly charts

Year-end charts

Certifications

Release history

References

2017 singles
2017 songs
Reggaeton songs
Ozuna (singer) songs
Romeo Santos songs
Songs written by Ozuna (singer)